Karin Himboldt (1920–2005) was a German film actress. She is perhaps best known for her roles in the Heinz Rühmann comedy films Quax the Crash Pilot (1941) and Die Feuerzangenbowle (1944). Her career was damaged in 1944 when the Nazi regime banned her from filming: Himboldt had denied the Nazi salute at the premiere of Die Feuerzangenbowle and was also married to a so-called "Half-Jew". She retired from film acting in 1959 and married the boss of a chemical concern in Basel.

Filmography

References

Bibliography
 Goble, Alan. The Complete Index to Literary Sources in Film. Walter de Gruyter, 1999.

External links

Obituary in Die Welt

1920 births
2005 deaths
German film actresses
Actresses from Munich